Atal Bihari Vajpayee Vishwavidyalaya  (formerly Bilaspur Vishwavidyalaya), is a public state university located in Bilaspur, Chhattisgarh, India. Founded in 2012, it is a teaching-cum-affiliating university which affiliates 164 colleges and has 5 departments. In a report by Dainik Bhaskar, the newspaper states that positions for professors in the University were not filled due to State Government disapproval.

The university was established by an Act (No. 7 of 2012) - The Chhattisgarh vishwavidyalaya (Amendment) Act, 2011 of state legislature of Chhattisgarh. The university is located in Old High Court in Bilaspur, Chhattisgarh.

Academics
Atal Bihari Vajpayee University offers Bachelor and Masters as well as various Diplomas and certificate programs in many disciplines.
Bachelor of Commerce (Hons.)
Masters of Commerce
Bachelor of Science in Food Processing & Technology
Master of Science in Food Processing & Technology
Bachelor of Science in Computer Science & Application(Hons.)
Master of Science in Computer Science & Application(Hons.)
Bachlor in Hotel Management (BHM)
Master of Science in Microbiology & Bio-Informatics

Affiliated colleges
Its jurisdiction extends over 4 districts- Bilaspur, Gaurela-Pendra-Marwahi, Korba, Mungeli .

See also

References

External links

Educational institutions established in 2012
2012 establishments in Chhattisgarh
Universities in Chhattisgarh
Education in Bilaspur, Chhattisgarh
Memorials to Atal Bihari Vajpayee